Lu Yun-feng (born 16 January 1984) is a Taiwanese table tennis player. 

She competed in women's doubles at the 2004 Summer Olympics in Athens.

References

1984 births
Living people
Taiwanese female table tennis players
Olympic table tennis players of Taiwan
Table tennis players at the 2004 Summer Olympics
Asian Games medalists in table tennis
Table tennis players at the 2002 Asian Games
Table tennis players at the 2006 Asian Games
Asian Games bronze medalists for Chinese Taipei
Medalists at the 2006 Asian Games
21st-century Taiwanese women